George Strange Boulton (September 11, 1797 – February 13, 1869) was a lawyer and political figure in Upper Canada.

Life and career
He was born near Albany, New York, in 1797, the son of D’Arcy Boulton, and came to Upper Canada with his family around 1800. He studied at John Strachan's school in Cornwall. He served during the War of 1812. In 1818, he was called to the bar and began work as a lawyer in Port Hope.

In 1824, he was appointed registrar for Northumberland County and he moved to Cobourg, the county seat. At the start of the 1837 rebellion, he became a member of the militia.

He was first elected to the Legislative Assembly of Upper Canada for Durham in 1824; his election was declared invalid in 1825. In 1830, he was elected in Durham and represented it in the legislative assembly until 1841. He was a loyal Conservative and supported the expulsion of William Lyon Mackenzie from the assembly. In 1847, he was appointed to the Legislative Council of the Province of Canada.

He died in Cobourg, Ontario, in 1869. His brother, Henry John Boulton, was Attorney General in Upper Canada.

External links 
Biography at the Dictionary of Canadian Biography Online

1797 births
1869 deaths
Politicians from Albany, New York
American emigrants to pre-Confederation Ontario
Canadian people of English descent
Lawyers in Ontario
Members of the Legislative Assembly of Upper Canada
Members of the Legislative Council of the Province of Canada
People from Cobourg
Politicians from Toronto
Immigrants to Upper Canada